Emanoil Constantin Teodorescu (May 10, 1866–1949) was a Romanian botanist.

He was elected a titular member of the Romanian Academy in 1949.

References

1866 births
1949 deaths
Romanian botanists
Titular members of the Romanian Academy